MDCPM, or 3,4-methylenedioxy-N-cyclopropylmethylamphetamine, is a lesser-known psychedelic drug. It is the N-cyclopropyl derivative of MDMA. MDCPM was first synthesized by Alexander Shulgin; it is also one of the compounds delineated in a patent by Horrom in 1972. In his book PiHKAL (Phenethylamines i Have Known And Loved), the minimum dosage is listed as 10 mg, and the duration unknown. MDCPM produces few to no effects.  Very little data exists about the pharmacological properties, metabolism, and toxicity of MDCPM.

Legality

United Kingdom
This substance is a Class A drug in the Drugs controlled by the UK Misuse of Drugs Act.

See also 
 Phenethylamine
 Psychedelics, dissociatives and deliriants
 MDA

References

External links 
 MDCPM entry in PiHKAL
 MDCPM entry in PiHKAL • info

Substituted amphetamines
Benzodioxoles
Cyclopropanes